Boland and Cornelius Company was a shipping company founded in 1904 by Messrs Boland and Adam E. Cornelius in Buffalo, New York. Adam Edwards Cornelius came up with the idea of having self-unloading ships to save time and money.  Adam Edwards Cornelius self-unloading ships changed the way ships were unloading. In 1907 Boland and Cornelius founded the American Steamship Company a subsidiary of Boland and Cornelius Company. American Steamship Company later became the current GATX Corporation. Boland and Cornelius Company flew a white and red flag with B&C in blue.

In 1973, the Boland and Cornelius families sold Boland and Cornelius Company and American Steamship Company to the General American Transportation Corporation (GATX).  GATX sold the shipping company to RAND Logistics Inc. in 2020. RAND Logistics Inc. was founded in 2006 and has purchased other shipping companies.

Messrs Boland first shipping company was on the Great Lakes with his brothers. Messrs Boland, John J. Boland and Joseph Boland founded the J.J. Boland  Company, also J.J. Boland Jr. Company in 1895 in Buffalo, New York. In 1901 Joseph Boland departed the shipping company.

Self-unloading ships

Adam Edwards Cornelius bulk-carrier self-unloading ships used a Conveyor belt arm to unload cargo. The American Shipbuilding Company was the first to build these new ships.

World War II
In 1941 Boland and Cornelius Company operated as an agent for the American Steamship Company. Boland and Cornelius Company operated a fleet of ships that were used to help the World War II effort. During World War II Boland and Cornelius Company operated Merchant navy ships for the United States Shipping Board. During World War II was active with charter shipping with the Maritime Commission and War Shipping Administration. Boland and Cornelius Company operated Liberty ships and tankers for the merchant navy. The ship was run by its Boland and Cornelius Company crew and the US Navy supplied United States Navy Armed Guards to man the deck guns and radio.

Ships

SS Yale first steel ship
Adam E. Cornelius (1) (1908)
SS William G. Mather built in 1905
Adam E. Cornelius (2)
Adam E. Cornelius (3),  self-unloading ships, built in 1959
Hugh Kenndey 1907 laker
MV John J. Boland built in 1973
MV Saginaw  Built in 1953
 
J.J. Boland  Company ships:
SV Alta a 1905 Schooner 1884-1905
J.J. Boland Jr, sank

Liberty ships operated:
James F. Harrell 
Alexander Lillington
SS Harold T. Andrews  
 La Salle Seam 
 Darel M. Ritter  
 Mary Wilkins Freeman  
 Francis A. Retka 
 Thomas H. Gallaudet 
 Pocahontas Seam  
 Jellico Seam

See also

World War II United States Merchant Navy

External links 
 ASC website

References 

Defunct shipping companies of the United States
American companies established in 1904